Die Prophezeiung (The Prophecy) is the third album from the German music group E Nomine.

Track listing

Normal CD 
 "Seit Anbeginn der Zeit...(Intro)" [Since the Beginning of Time]
 "Die Verheissung (Interlude)" [The Prophecy]
 "Deine Welt" [Your World]
 "Schwarzer Traum (Interlude)" [Black Dream]
 "Mondengel" [Angel of the Moon]
 "Der Lockruf (Interlude)" [The Call]
 "Das Omen (im Kreis des Bösen)" [The Omen (in the Circle of Evil)]
 "Lauf der Zeit (Interlude)" [The Passage of Time]
 "Das Rad des Schicksals" [The Wheels of Destiny]
 "Das Orakel (Interlude)" [The Oracle]
 "Der Blaubeermund" [The Blueberry-Mouth]
 "Sternensturm (Interlude)" [Storm of Stars]
 "Im Zeichen des Zodiak" [Under the Sign of Zodiak]
 "Die Brücke ins Licht (Interlude)" [The Bridge Into Light]
 "Laetitia"  [Happiness]
 "Das Rätsel (Interlude)" [The Riddle]
 "Der Prophet" [The Prophet]
 "Land der Hoffnung (Interlude)" [Land of Hope]
 "Anderwelt (Laterna magica)" [Otherworld]
 "In den Fängen von... (Interlude)" [In the Clutches Of...]
 "Mysteria" [Mysteries]
 "Friedhof der Engel (Interlude)" [Graveyard of Angels]
 "Die Runen von Asgard" [The Runes of Asgard]
 "Das Erwachen (Interlude)" [The Awakening]
 "Schwarze Sonne" [Black Sun]
 "Endzeit (Interlude)" [Endtimes]
 "Jetzt ist es still" [Everything Is Silent Now]

Klassik Edition
Released on 14 April 2003 from Universal Music Group.

 "Der Weg des Schicksals… Veni, Vidi, Fatum" [The Path of Destiny… I Came, I Saw, I Spoke]
 "Die Verheissung (Interlude)" [The Promise (Interlude)]
 "Deine Welt" [Your World]
 "Das Orakel (Interlude)" [The Oracle (Interlude)]
 "Der Blaubeermund" [The Blueberry-Mouth]
 "Der Lockruf (Interlude)" [The Call (Interlude)]
 "Das Omen (im Kreis des Bösen)" [The Omen (in the Circle of Evil)]
 "Schwarze Göttin (Interlude)" [Black Goddess (Interlude)]
 "Morgane le Fay"
 "Sternensturm (Interlude)" [Star Storm (Interlude)]
 "Im Zeichen des Zodiak" [In the Sign of the Zodiac]
 "Die Brücke ins Licht (Interlude)" [The Bridge into the Light]
 "Laetitia" [Happiness]
 "Die Befreiten (Interlude)" [The Freed (Interlude)]
 "Friedenshymne" [Peace Hymn]
 "Land der Hoffnung (Interlude)" [Land of Hope (Interlude)]
 "Anderwelt (Laterna magica)" [Otherworld (Magic Lantern)]
 "Der Geist der Luft (Interlude)" [The Spirit of the Air (Interlude)]
 "Espíritu del Aire" [Spirit of the Air]
 "Lauf der Zeit (Interlude)" [The Passage of Time (Interlude)]
 "Das Rad des Schicksals" [The Wheel of Fate]
 "Das Erwachen (Interlude)" [The Awakening (Interlude)]
 "Schwarze Sonne" [Black Sun]
 "In den Fängen von… (Interlude)" [In the Clutches of… (Interlude)]
 "Mysteria" [Mysteries]
 "Die Rückkehr der Ewigkeit (Interlude)" [The Return of Eternity (Interlude)]
 "Ein neuer Tag" [A New Day]

Re-Release
Released on 10 November 2003 from Polydor Records.

 "Seit Anbeginn der Zeit..."
 "Das Erwachen" - Interlude
 "Schwarze Sonne"
 "Der Lockruf" - Interlude
 "Das Omen (im Kreis des Bösen)"
 "Die Verheissung" - Interlude
 "Deine Welt"
 "Lauf der Zeit" - Interlude
 "Das Rad des Schicksals"
 "Spirale des Todes" - Interlude
 "Spiegelbilder"
 "Das Orakel" - Interlude
 "Der Blaubeermund"
 "Sternensturm" - Interlude
 "Im Zeichen des Zodiak"
 "Die Brücke ins Licht" - Interlude
 "Laetitia"
 "Das Rätsel" - Interlude
 "Der Prophet"
 "Land der Hoffnung" - Interlude
 "Anderwelt" (Laterna Magica)
 "Im Schlafe des Lichts" - Interlude
 "Carpe Noctem"
 "In den Fängen von..." - Interlude
 "Mysteria"
 "Friedhof der Engel" - Interlude
 "Die Runen von Asgard"
 "Schwarzer Traum" - Interlude
 "Mondengel"
 "So steht es geschrieben..." - Interlude
 "Wer den Wind sät..."
 "Endzeit" - Interlude
 "Jetzt ist es still"

DVD

References

2003 albums
E Nomine albums